Ardattin is a village and townland in County Carlow, Ireland. It lies in the civil parish of Ardoyne in the historical barony of Forth. As of the 2011 census, the townland had a population of 34 people.

The local Roman Catholic church, the Church of the Immaculate Conception, was built in 1954 and is in Tullow Parish of the Diocese of Kildare and Leighlin.

People
Pierce Butler, slaveholder and Founding Father
Saoirse Ronan, actress

References

Towns and villages in County Carlow